The 1960 New Mexico State Aggies football team represented New Mexico State University in the Border Conference during the 1960 NCAA University Division football season. The Aggies, led by third-year head coach Warren B. Woodson, played their home games at Memorial Stadium. They finished the season with a record of 11–0 and 4–0 in conference play. Until the 2017 school year, this was the most recent New Mexico State team to play in a bowl game.

For the second time in what proved to be four consecutive years, a New Mexico State back won the NCAA rushing title, Pervis Atkins in 1959, Bob Gaiters in 1960, and Preacher Pilot in 1961 and 1962.

Head coach Warren B. Woodson was later inducted into the College Football Hall of Fame.

Schedule

References

New Mexico State
New Mexico State Aggies football seasons
Border Conference football champion seasons
Sun Bowl champion seasons
College football undefeated seasons
New Mexico State Aggies football